Ivan Rosenqvist (17 May 1916 – 8 October 1994) was an Austrian-born Norwegian geologist. He was born in Vienna. His research focus centered on marine sediments. He was appointed professor of mineralogy and geology at the University of Oslo from 1965 to 1984. During the German occupation of Norway, Rosenqvist had a central position in the clandestine intelligence organization XU.

Rosenqvist was a volunteer in the Winter War on the Finnish side.

References

1916 births
1994 deaths
Scientists from Vienna
Marine geologists
20th-century Norwegian geologists
University of Oslo alumni
Academic staff of the University of Oslo
Volunteers in the Winter War
Norwegian Army personnel of World War II
XU
Grini concentration camp survivors
Norwegian prisoners sentenced to death
Prisoners sentenced to death by Germany
Sachsenhausen concentration camp survivors
Austrian emigrants to Norway
Norwegian expatriates in Finland